Thalattu Ketkuthamma is a 1991 Indian Tamil-language drama film directed by Raj Kapoor in his directorial debut. The film stars Prabhu and Kanaka. It was remade in Telugu as Chittemma Mogudu.

Plot

Raasaiyya, a young man, wants to get married as soon as possible and he compels his uncle. His cousin Pechiamma is an immature tomboy. After seeing her friend Valli dying while delivering a child, Pechiamma thinks after the marriage, she will die. Raasaiyya finally gets married with Pechiamma. Thereafter, Pechiamma avoids Raasaiyya although he treasures her. One day, Raasaiyya comes drunk in his house and rapes Pechiamma, leaving her pregnant. What transpires later forms the crux of the story.

Cast

Prabhu as Rasaiya 
Kanaka as Pechiyamma
Goundamani as Rasaiya's uncle
Senthil as Pulipandi
Silk Smitha as Dr. Mary
Vadivukkarasi as Vadivu 
Mounica as Valli
Vijaya Chandrika
R. P. Viswam as Viswam
Oru Viral Krishna Rao
Pandu
Chokkalinga Bhagavathar as Muthukalai
Boopathiraja 
MRK
Omakuchi Narasimhan
Kovai Senthil
Sakthivel

Soundtrack

The soundtrack was composed by Ilaiyaraaja. The soundtrack, released in 1991, features 6 tracks with lyrics written by Vaali.

Release and reception 
Thalattu Ketkuthamma was released on 5 November 1991. The Indian Express wrote, "With a storyline that can be written at the backside of bus ticket, it is not surprising that debutant director Raj Kapoor [..] spends most of the time beating around the bush". C. R. K. of Kalki called Thalattu Ketkuthamma a "boost" for Prabhu.

In popular culture 
The film is noted for the song 'Ho gaya' sung by Goundamani and also gained popularity.

References

External links
 

1991 films
Films scored by Ilaiyaraaja
Tamil films remade in other languages
1990s Tamil-language films
1991 directorial debut films
Films directed by Raj Kapoor (Tamil film director)